Wen Tsung-yao (1876 – November 30, 1947), courtesy name Qinfu (欽甫), was a politician and diplomat in the Qing Dynasty and the Republic of China. In the late Qing era, he belonged to the pro-reform group. In the era of the Republic, he participated in the Sun Yat-sen's Canton Militarist Government. However, during the invasion of Japanese, he was a leading politician in the Reformed Government of the Republic of China and the Wang Jingwei regime, which were puppets state installed by the Japanese. He was born in Sunning (now Taishan), Kwangtung.

Biography

In late Qing Dynasty 
He entered the Government Central School, Hong Kong, and Sun Yat-sen was his schoolmate. He was a member of the Furen Literary Society which advocated revolution against the Qing Dynasty. In 1895 Wen joined the Revive China Society founded by Sun. In 1897 he studied at the Imperial Tientsin University, after graduating, he became an English teacher of the Queen's College(reformed from the Government Central School). Later he became a secretary for Feng Keyi who engaged in the work for negotiating to United Kingdom.

In July 1900 Wen Tsung-yao participated in the Independence Army uprising which was organized by pr-reform leader Tang Caichang, and Wen was appointed a representative for foreign affairs to Shanghai. Wen escaped to Southern China and got positions under the Viceroy of Liangguang. From 1903 to 1908, he successively held the positions of Chief of Foreign Affairs Bureau of Liangguang, Director to the Telephone Administration of Guangdong, Director to the Military Cadets' Academy of Guangdong (廣東將辦學堂), etc. In 1904 he was sent to India as Deputy Envoy to negotiate with the British Government over the question of British trade in Tibet and a member of the Tang Shaoyi's party. In same August Wen returned to China, and became a secretary for foreign affairs to the Viceroy of Liangguang Cen Chunxuan.

In 1908 Wen Tsung-yao was appointed Deputy President reside in Tibet as the representative of Qing Dynasty. On that time, United Kingdom's influence to Dalai Lama XIII was strengthened. So Wen wanted to recover Qing's influence, and insisted that Qing's troops station at Tibet to Dalai Lama XIII. But Dalai Lama XIII had protested against Qing's troops entered to Tibet, he fled to India, and Qing declared dethroning him. Later Wen returned to Peking, he was appointed a Councillor of the Foreign Office.

In the early years of the Republic of China
In October 1911 Xinhai Revolution broke out, Wen Tsung-yao, Wu Tingfang and Zhang Jian declared their support for republicanism. After the Republic of China was established in 1912, Wen participated in the movement for political parties. In August 1912 he participated in the Song Jiaoren's Kuomintang where he was appointed a councilor. In December 1915 the National Protection War broke out, Wen joined the National Protection Army against Yuan Shikai. In May 1916 the Military Bureau() was established, Wen was appointed Deputy Diplomatic Envoy.

In September 1917 Sun Yat-sen started the Constitutional Protection Movement, and established the Canton Militarist Government. Wen also participated in it, but he supported Cen Chunxuan who was in opposition to Sun. In May 1918 Sun lost the leadership in the Government, when the governmental System was transformed to 7-President System. As Cen got the position of Chief of the Presidents, the disappointed Sun resigned as the President. In April 1920 Wen was appointed Minister for Foreign Affairs by Cen, and in May, also got the position of President. But in November, Cen was defeated by Sun and Chen Jiongming's troops, Wen also retired and hid in Shanghai for over 10 years.

In the Reformed Government and the Wang Jingwei regime

In February 1938 Wen Tsung-yao was contacted by the Japanese who were invading China, and started to organize the Puppet Government for Japan with Liang Hongzhi. In the next month, they established the Reformed Government of the Republic of China in Nanking, Wen was appointed Chief of the Legislative Yuan. In March 1940 the Wang Jingwei regime was established, Wen was appointed Chief of the Judicial Yuan, and successively held many important positions.

After Japan unconditionally surrendered and the Wang Jingwei regime collapsed, Wen Tsung-yao was arrested by the Nationalist Government in Shanghai on September 27, 1945. On July 8, he was sentenced to life imprisonment on the charge of treason (Hanjian).

Wen Tsung-yao died in prison in Nanking on November 30, 1947.

Alma mater

Queen's College, Hong KongTianjin University

References

Footnotes 
 Shao Guihua, Wen Zongyao. 
 
 
 
 
 

Republic of China politicians from Guangdong
Foreign Ministers of the Republic of China
Chinese collaborators with Imperial Japan
Kuomintang collaborators with Imperial Japan
1876 births
1947 deaths
People from Taishan, Guangdong
Politicians from Jiangmen